130th may refer to:

130th (Devon and Cornwall) Brigade, British Territorial Force division formed in 1908
130th (Lanark and Renfrew) Battalion, CEF, unit in the Canadian Expeditionary Force during the First World War
130th Airlift Squadron flies the C-130H Hercules
130th Airlift Wing, airlift unit located at Yeager Airport, Charleston, West Virginia
130th Baluchis, infantry regiment of the British Indian Army raised in 1858
130th Delaware General Assembly, meeting of the legislative branch of the Delaware state government
130th Engineer Brigade (United States), engineer brigade of the United States Army based in Schofield Barracks, Hawaii
130th Illinois Volunteer Infantry Regiment, infantry regiment that served in the Union Army during the American Civil War
130th Infantry Brigade (United Kingdom), Territorial brigade of the British Army
130th Infantry Regiment (United States), infantry regiment in the Army National Guard
130th Kentucky Derby or 2004 Kentucky Derby
130th Light Anti-Aircraft Regiment or Royal Scots, the oldest infantry regiment of the line in the British Army
130th meridian east, line of longitude across the Arctic Ocean, Asia, Australia, the Indian Ocean, the Southern Ocean and Antarctica
130th meridian west, line of longitude across the Arctic Ocean, North America, the Pacific Ocean, the Southern Ocean and Antarctica
130th New York Volunteer Infantry Regiment, infantry regiment that served in the Union Army during the American Civil War
130th Ohio Infantry (or 130th OVI), infantry regiment in the Union Army during the American Civil War
130th Regiment of Foot, infantry regiment of the British Army, created in 1794 and disbanded in 1796
130th Rescue Squadron, unit of the California Air National Guard
130th Street (IRT Ninth Avenue Line), station on the demolished IRT Ninth Avenue Line
130th Street (Manhattan) or Astor Row, in the New York City borough of Manhattan
German 130th Panzer Lehr Division or Panzer Lehr Division, German armored division during World War II
Pennsylvania's 130th Representative District or Pennsylvania House of Representatives, District 130

See also
130 (number)
AD 130, the year 130 (CXXX) of the Julian calendar
130 BC